Drisan Bryant James (born October 6, 1984 in Phoenix, Arizona) is a former gridiron football wide receiver. He was signed by the Chicago Bears as an undrafted free agent in 2007. He played college football for the Boise State Broncos.

James has also been a member of the Oakland Raiders and Philadelphia Eagles.

College career
James played college football at Boise State. During his college career, he achieved a total of 115 receptions for 1810 yards. He also rushed 14 times for a gain of 124 yards. Led the team in receiving yards per game (46.2) and yards per catch (16.8) during the 2006 season.

James is best known for his performance in the 2007 Fiesta Bowl, where he caught two touchdown passes against the University of Oklahoma and helped lead Boise State to a 43-42 victory in overtime.  Most spectacularly, on a fourth down play with eighteen seconds left in regulation, James caught an eighteen-yard pass and made a brilliant lateral to teammate Jerard Rabb running the opposite way, resulting in a game-tying touchdown with seven seconds left.  The play required James to "sell" to the defense the notion that he was going to keep the ball and try for a first down, and also to lateral the ball at the last instant yet lead his teammate in full stride.  A close look at the replay shows that had the lateral not been timed and delivered perfectly, the receiver would likely not have made it to the end zone for the tying score.

Professional career

National Football League
James signed a free agent contract with the National Football League Chicago Bears in May, 2007. He was on the practice squad of the Oakland Raiders during the 2007 season.  He is now a Free Agent.

On November 24, 2008, James signed a contract with the Philadelphia Eagles to be on the practice squad.

Canadian Football League
James signed with the Hamilton Tiger-Cats on May 29, 2009. He played two seasons for the team.

Post-career 
James now works as a software engineer in Boise, Idaho.

External links
Just Sports Stats
Oakland Raiders bio

References

1984 births
Living people
Sportspeople from Phoenix, Arizona
American football wide receivers
Canadian football wide receivers
American players of Canadian football
Boise State Broncos football players
Chicago Bears players
Oakland Raiders players
Philadelphia Eagles players
Hamilton Tiger-Cats players
Players of American football from Phoenix, Arizona